Karolina Sadalska (born 30 June 1981) is a Polish sprint canoer who won competed in the early to mid-2000s. She won five medals at the ICF Canoe Sprint World Championships with a gold (K-4 1000 m: 2002), two silvers (K-4 500 m: 2003, K-4 1000 m: 2001), and two bronzes (K-4 200 m: 2001, 2003).

Sadalska also finished fourth in the K-4 500 m event at the 2004 Summer Olympics in Athens.

References

1981 births
Canoeists at the 2004 Summer Olympics
Living people
Olympic canoeists of Poland
Polish female canoeists
Sportspeople from Gorzów Wielkopolski
ICF Canoe Sprint World Championships medalists in kayak
21st-century Polish women